Dandenong North is a suburb in Melbourne, Victoria, Australia, 27 km south-east of Melbourne's Central Business District, located within the City of Greater Dandenong local government area.

History

Dandenong North Post Office opened on 18 July 1955 as the suburb was developed.

About

Dandenong North is situated approximately 30 kilometres from the CBD, being very close to the Monash Freeway , the road formerly known as the South Eastern Arterial and the Mulgrave Freeway. There are several schools in the locality. The area was once known as Lyndale. Dandenong North is also subject to the EastLink Freeway (which connects the South-East with the Eastern Arterials).

55% of Dandenong North residents were born overseas.

See also
 City of Dandenong – Dandenong North was previously within this former local government area.

References

Suburbs of Melbourne
Suburbs of the City of Greater Dandenong